Broken Spindles was a band solely consisting of Joel Petersen of Omaha, Nebraska, who also played bass, guitar and keyboards in The Faint. The music of Broken Spindles ranged from instrumental electronic songs to sparse piano pieces to rock-influenced pop songs. Broken Spindles originally started in 2001 as the soundtrack for a friend's film. It developed into a solo project with the first release in 2002 on Tiger Style Records. In between touring with the Faint and Beep Beep, Petersen found time to write music for Broken Spindles.

Discography

Albums
Broken Spindles (2002 · Tiger Style Records)
fulfilled/complete (2004 · Saddle Creek Records)
inside/absent (2005 · Saddle Creek Records)
Document Number One (2008 · self-released)
Kiss/Kick (2009 · blank.wav)

Compilations
Lagniappe: A Saddle Creek Benefit for Hurricane Katrina (2005 · Saddle Creek)
song: "Move Away (Broken Spindles Remix)"

Remixes

Yo Gabba Gabba - Summer Remix
Her Space Holiday - "My Girlfriend's Boyfriend"
 AFI - "Miss Murder"
 of Montreal - "Wraith Pinned to The Mist and Other Games".
 Good Charlotte - Keep Your Hands Off My Girl" .
 Manic - "Carolina Ghost"

See also
Beep Beep
The Faint

External links
Official site
Saddle Creek Records
Saddle Creek Records: Broken Spindles
Broken Spindles on MySpace
Broken Spindles at the Saddle Creek US Online Store

Interviews
Lazy-i Interview: October 2002
Lazy-i Interview: June 2004
One Times One Interview: March 2004

Musical groups from Nebraska
Remixers
Saddle Creek Records artists